Amanullah Khan (10 October 1933 – 12 March 2005) was a Pakistani cricket umpire. He stood in 13 Test matches between 1975 and 1987 and 13 ODI games between 1980 and 1993.

See also
 List of Test cricket umpires
 List of One Day International cricket umpires

References

1933 births
2005 deaths
People from Kasur District
Pakistani Test cricket umpires
Pakistani One Day International cricket umpires